This article lists the chapters of Phi Kappa Tau Fraternity in Greek alphabetical (chronological) order followed by their dates of chartering as Phi Kappa Tau chapters.

Some chapters listed no longer have active collegiate chapters, known in Phi Kappa Tau as Resident Councils, though the alumni organizations (Graduate Councils) may still be active.  *Indicates inactive chapter.

List of chapters
 Miami University, 1906 Associate Chapter
 Ohio University, 1911
 Ohio State University, 1912
 Centre College, 1914
 University of Mount Union, 1915
 University of Illinois, 1916
 Muhlenberg College, 1918* 
 Transylvania University, 1919
 Coe College, 1920
 University of Kentucky, 1920
 Purdue University, 1920
 Lawrence University, 1920* disbanded 2019
 University of California-Berkeley, 1921
 Franklin and Marshall College, 1921
 Pennsylvania State University, 1922  
 University of Southern California, 1922 
 Rensselaer Polytechnic Institute, 1922*
 Syracuse University, 1922*
 University of Michigan, 1923*
 Nebraska Wesleyan University, 1923
 Bethany College (West Virginia), 1923
 North Carolina State University, 1923, rechartered 2019
 University of Colorado, 1924
 University of Wisconsin–Madison, 1924, rechartered 2022
 Michigan State University, 1924 
 New York University, 1924*
 University of Delaware, 1924 
 Case Western Reserve University, 1925*
 Kansas State University, 1925*
 Oregon State University, 1925*
 University of Florida, 1926
 College of William and Mary, 1926*
 University of Pennsylvania, 1926*
 Washington State University, 1927
 Auburn University, 1927 
 Ohio Wesleyan University, 1928*
 Iowa State University, 1928*
 West Virginia University, 1928*
 Lafayette College, 1928*
 University of Washington, 1929
 Georgia Institute of Technology, 1929
 Colorado State University, 1929
 Cornell University, 1930
 Colgate University, 1937
 University of Akron, 1938
 Mississippi State University, 1938
 University of Texas-El Paso, 1941*
 Baldwin Wallace College, 1942
 University of Texas-Austin, 1943
 University of Louisville, 1947
 University of Idaho, 1947
 University of Miami, 1948*
 University of Southern Mississippi, 1948
 New Mexico State University, 1948*
 University of New Mexico, 1948*
 University of Kansas, 1948  Associate Chapter
 Florida State University, 1949*
 Oklahoma State University, 1949
 Indiana University, 1949*
 Kent State University, 1949
 San Diego State University, 1950*
 University of Georgia, 1950
 University of Maryland, College Park, 1950
 Middlebury College, 1950*
 University of California, Los Angeles, 1950*
 Idaho State University, 1950*
 Bowling Green State University, 1950*
 Hobart College, 1952*
 Westminster College, 1952
 Southern Illinois University, 1953
 California State University, Long Beach, 1956
 California State University, Chico, 1958

 Michigan Technological University, 1959
 University of Cincinnati, 1959
 Saint John's University, 1960*
 Northern Michigan University, 1961* disbanded 1990
 University of the Pacific, 1961*
 University of Connecticut, 1961*
 East Carolina University, 1962*
 Western Michigan University, 1962*
 California State University, Sacramento, 1963
 C.W. Post Campus of Long Island University, 1964*
 Central Michigan University, 1965*
 Bradley University, 1965
 Rochester Institute of Technology, 1966*
 East Central University, 1966
 California State University, Fullerton, 1966* (Suspended until 2024)
 Youngstown State University, 1967*
 University of Nebraska-Kearney, 1967*
 University of California, Davis, 1967*
 Old Dominion University, 1967*
 Spring Hill College, 1967*
 Northeastern University, 1968*
 Delta State University, 1968*
 Southwest Texas State University, 1968
 La Salle University, 1968*
 Iowa Wesleyan College, 1968*
 University of Evansville, 1968
 University of Mississippi, 1969
 Bryant University, 1969*
 St. Cloud State University, 1969*
 Emporia State University, 1970*
 Marshall University, 1970*
 Georgetown College, 1970
 New Mexico Highlands University, 1970*
 University of Tennessee, Knoxville, 1971
 Muskingum College, 1971
 College of Santa Fe, 1972*
 Wright State University, 1975  Associate Chapter
 Cleveland State University, 1975*
 University of Texas-Pan American, 1975*
 Murray State University, 1982*
 Eastern Kentucky University, 1982, Rechartered 2021 
 Webber International University, 1982*
 California State Polytechnic University, Pomona, 1984
 University of Tennessee at Martin, 1984*
 University of Arkansas, 1984*
 University of Rochester, 1985, Rechartered 2012
 Rider University, 1986*
 Truman State University, 1987
 Texas A&M University, 1987*
 West Virginia University Institute of Technology, 1987
 The College of New Jersey, 1988*
 Virginia Wesleyan College, 1988 
 William Paterson University, 1989
 Buffalo State College, 1989*
 State University of New York at Oswego, 1990*
 San Francisco State University, 1990
 Barry University, 1993*
 Rutgers University, 1993
 Longwood University, 1994
 University of North Carolina at Pembroke, 1994*
 Clemson University, 1995 Associate Chapter
 Pace University, 1995*
 Frostburg State University, 1996*
 Northern Kentucky University, 1997*
 Indiana University of Pennsylvania, 1997
 Chapman University, 1998
 University of Arizona, 1998
 Saint Louis University, 1998*
 Indiana State University, 1999*
 Virginia Polytechnic Institute and State University, 2001
 John Carroll University, 2001*
 Shepherd University, 2002*
 Belmont University, 2006
 Saginaw Valley State University, 2009*
  San Jose Area (Not school affiliated), 2012
  College of Charleston, 2012* 
  University of Lynchburg, 2014
  University of Illinois at Springfield, 2014
  University of Alabama, 2014
  University of North Texas, 2015
  Indiana University Kokomo, 2015*
  Kenyon College, 2015
  Middle Tennessee State University, 2015
  Appalachian State University, 2016 
 University of Minnesota Duluth, 2016*
 University of South Carolina, 2017
 Arizona State University, 2018
  Boston University, 2018
  Columbus State University, 2019*
  Grand Valley State University

References

https://www.phikappatau.org/find-a-chapter

External links
 Chapter locator at Phi Kappa Tau's website

Phi Kappa Tau
Lists of chapters of United States student societies by society